Entravision Communications Corporation is an American media company based in Santa Monica, California. Entravision primarily caters to the Spanish-speaking Hispanic community and owns television and radio stations and outdoor media, in several of the top Hispanic markets. It is the largest affiliate group of the Univision and UniMás television networks. Entravision also owns a small number of English-language television and radio stations.

History
On August 4, 2006, Entravision sold five of its radio stations in the Dallas–Fort Worth area to Liberman Broadcasting. On May 16, 2008, the company sold its outdoor media division, whose operations were primarily based in New York and Los Angeles, to Lamar Advertising Company.

In 2007, Entravision Communications Corporation acquired Spanish-language radio station WNUE-FM serving the Orlando, Florida, market from Mega Communications for an aggregate purchase price of approximately $24 million.

On 2018, Entravision acquired Barcelona based DSP Smadex.

In October 2020, the company announced the acquisition of a majority stake in Latin American digital media company Cisneros Interactive from Grupo Cisneros.

Business
The company owns multiple radio and television stations, and the a sales and marketing business.

Radio

Television

Other holdings 
 Entravision Solutions (50 percent) – National spot radio advertising representative specializing in Spanish-language stations; co-owned with Lotus Communications.

Formerly owned media properties 
 New York City – El Diario La Prensa (now owned by ImpreMedia)
 Dallas/Fort Worth, Texas – KTCY 101.7 FM (Sold to Liberman Broadcasting)
 Dallas/Fort Worth, Texas – KRVA La Buena 1600 (Sold to Mortenson Broadcasting)
 Dallas/Fort Worth, Texas – KZMP Radio Saalam Namaste FM 104.9/AM 1540 (Sold to Liberman Broadcasting)
 Dallas/Fort Worth, Texas – KZZA Casa 106.7 FM (Sold to Liberman Broadcasting)
 San Jose, California – KBRG 100.3 FM "Radio Romántica" (Sold to Univision)
 San Jose, California – KLOK 1170 AM (Sold to Univision)
 Salinas, California - KCBA (sold to News-Press & Gazette Company)
 New York, New York – Vista Media Group, an outdoor advertising division (Sold to Lamar Advertising Company)
 Reno, Nevada – KNVV-LP (license cancelled by FCC May 23, 2014)
 Tampa, Florida – WVEA-LP (license cancelled by FCC April 22, 2015)
 Denver, Colorado – KDVT-LP (license cancelled by FCC September 13, 2017)
 Albuquerque, New Mexico – KTFA-LP (license cancelled by FCC January 17, 2018)
 Las Vegas, Nevada – KMCC (Sold to Ion Media Networks on April 3, 2020)
 Mesquite, etc., Nevada - KWWB-LP (license cancelled by FCC July 10, 2021)
 San Diego, California – KTCD-LP (license cancelled by FCC on August 9, 2021)
 Orlando, Florida - WNUE-FM (Sold to Radio Training Network on July 20, 2021)
 Houston, Texas - KGOL (Sold to FM Media Ventures on August 30, 2021)
 McAllen, Texas - XHRIO-TDT (license cancelled by IFT December 31, 2021)

References 

Univision
Mass media companies established in 1996
Companies listed on the New York Stock Exchange
Radio broadcasting companies of the United States
Television broadcasting companies of the United States
Companies based in Santa Monica, California
Entravision Communications stations
2018 mergers and acquisitions